Karetnikov (from карета meaning carriage) is a Russian masculine surname. Its feminine counterpart is Karetnikova. It may refer to:
Ivan Karetnikov (born 1942), Soviet swimmer 
 Nikolai Karetnikov (1930–1994), Russian composer
Valerji Karetnikov (born 1963), Soviet ski jumper

See also
 4685 Karetnikov asteroid

Russian-language surnames